Toshiki Yamamoto (山本俊樹; born ) is a Japanese weightlifter, competing in the 85 kg category until 2018 and 96 kg starting in 2018 after the International Weightlifting Federation reorganized the categories.

Career
He competed at the 2018 World Weightlifting Championships finishing ninth overall in the 89 kg division. At the 2019 World Weightlifting Championships he finished fifth overall in the same category.

Major results

References

External links 
 

1991 births
Living people
Japanese  male weightlifters
Weightlifters at the 2018 Asian Games
Asian Games competitors for Japan
Weightlifters at the 2020 Summer Olympics
Olympic weightlifters of Japan
21st-century Japanese people